Hans Goderis (1595/1600, Haarlem – 1656/1659, Haarlem) was a Dutch Golden Age painter.

Biography
Goderis was the son of Joris Goderis and Marijntgen Lijbaerts. He is first mentioned along with Cornelis Verbeeck in the book Harlemias by Theodorus Schrevelius as choosing marine painting.
Goderis painted primarily marine and seascape works. According to the RKD, he was the pupil of Jan Porcellis.

References

1590s births
1650s deaths
Artists from Haarlem
Dutch Golden Age painters
Dutch male painters
Dutch marine artists
Year of birth unknown
Year of death unknown